The Bold Pilgrim Cemetery is a historic African American cemetery in rural Conway County, Arkansas. The cemetery is estimated to have 600 burials, the largest number of which probably occurred in the first half of the 20th century.

History
The cemetery was founded about 1890 by an African American community that was located on a ridge west of the cemetery.  This community, founded by formerly enslaved people, declined in the 1960s, mainly for economic reasons. The cemetery was community-based, serving the members of various churches in the area.

Restoration
In 2006, the Bold Pilgrim Cemetery Preservation Association was founded to document and preserve the cemetery's history and grounds.

The cemetery was listed on the National Register of Historic Places in 2018.

See also
 National Register of Historic Places listings in Conway County, Arkansas

References

External links
 

Cemeteries on the National Register of Historic Places in Arkansas
National Register of Historic Places in Conway County, Arkansas
1890 establishments in Arkansas
Cultural infrastructure completed in 1890
African-American cemeteries in Arkansas
Cemeteries established in the 1890s